The Royal Order of Spain, originally founded as Ordre royal d'Espagne is an extinct order of knighthood of the Kingdom of Spain founded by Joseph Bonaparte.

History 
The Royal Order of Spain was founded by King Joseph of Spain on 20 October 1808, under the name of royal and military order (’ordre royal et militaire) to be awarded for bravery on the battlefield as well as for civilian accomplishments. It had three classes: grand cross (grand cordon); commander (commandeur) and knight (chevalier).

The order was abolished by King Ferdinand VII in 1814.

Members

Grands cordons 
 Miguel José de Azanza
 Baron Jean Baptiste Alexandre Strolz (15 February 1811)
General Antoine de Roten

Commandeurs 
 Antoine Aymard
 Juan Antonio Llorente
 Guillaume Balestrier, colonel of the Régiment Royal-Irlandais (Kingdom of Spain)
 Joseph Léopold Sigisbert Hugo
 François Joseph Marie Clary (1786–1841)

Chevaliers 
 Alexis-François Aulagnier
 Domingo de Cabarrús y Galabert (11 March 1810)
 Leandro Fernández de Moratín
 Francisco de Goya
 Jean-Baptiste Auguste Marie Jamin (19 November 1810)
 Louis-Joseph Hugo (25 October 1809)
 François-Juste Hugo
Luis Marcelino Pereira (27 October 1809)

References

Orders of chivalry of Spain
1808 establishments in Spain
Orders, decorations, and medals of Spain
Awards established in 1808